Electropop is a song released from the electronic dance group Jupiter Rising's album Electropop. It was released to Sirius Satellite radio on June 12, 2007 for digital download on June 19, 2007. The song charted on the Billboard's Hot Dance Music.

Background
The song runs through a downtempo dance beat. The instrumentation involved is that of synth-keyboards, guitars, synthesizer, and drum set. Electropop has the flirtatious banter of Furtado's "Promiscuous", a ready-made synth club beat, and even gives a slight name drop for 50 Cent's "Candy Shop".

Music video
The music video was directed by Paul "Coy" Allen, and edited by Ryan Stevens. The music video was released on June 23, 2007 to the internet. The music video starts out with the band played the synth-driven song starting with the synth-keyboards. The band is playing in front of a small audience. The video also has scenes of Payo and Nezzey singing in different places, such as in a salon or beside a car.

Track listing
 Digital single
 "Electropop" (main version) — 3:51

 Digital EP
 "Electropop" (Rod Carillo Mix) — 4:15
 "Electropop" (Rod Carillo Smooth Club Mix) — 7:07
 "Electropop" (Rod Carillo Funk Yo' Head Dub) — 7:07
 "Electropop" (Lenny B Radio Mix) — 4:38
 "Electropop" (Lenny B Club Mix) — 7:23

Charts

References

External links
 Jupiter Rising-Electropop

2007 singles
2007 songs
Jupiter Rising songs
Electropop songs